John McNiven (born 25 September 1945) is a Canadian rower. He competed in the men's double sculls event at the 1972 Summer Olympics.

References

1945 births
Living people
Canadian male rowers
Olympic rowers of Canada
Rowers at the 1972 Summer Olympics
People from Alexandria, West Dunbartonshire
Sportspeople from West Dunbartonshire